MV Loch Fyne is a Caledonian MacBrayne car ferry, owned by Caledonian Maritime Assets Limited, built in 1991 for the Isle of Skye crossing and now operating the Mallaig to Armadale route in western Scotland.

History
Loch Fyne entered service at Kyle of Lochalsh on 12 September 1991, replacing the last of the old ferries, . Even at this time, it was known that the Skye Bridge was coming.
Loch Fyne was laid up in James Watt Dock at Greenock for two years. No sale was completed and in 1997, CalMac prepared them for service once more. First,  was moved to the Colintraive - Rhubodach service. Then, on 27 September 1997, Loch Fyne was re-introduced to service and went to relieve the new , which had suffered a major breakdown at Lochaline on the Sound of Mull. Loch Fyne proved successful and became the permanent vessel on Mull's secondary crossing, having sufficient capacity to cope with all but the busiest days there. There was an earlier 1950s MacBrayne's motor vessel of the same name, which was last seen as an accommodation ship in Bristol Floating Harbour in the 2000s.

Layout
Passenger accommodation along the starboard side of the hull can cater for up to 250 persons, with lounges on two levels and an open deck above. The high sided design is prone to being caught by the wind. She initially had very wide ramps at both ends. These were first lengthened, to reduce the risk of long vehicles grounding, and later reduced in width and weight.

Service
Loch Fyne was built for service between Kyle of Lochalsh and Kyleakin on Skye. She and  provided a 24-hour service there from 1991. With the opening of the Skye bridge in 1995, they were laid up and offered for sale. In 1997, Loch Fyne successfully relieved on the  Lochaline to Fishnish route and became the regular vessel there until 2017. She also sailed between Mallaig and Armadale, relieving .

These trials concluded that major modifications would be needed to the vessel and the linkspans at both ports. In January 2017, CalMac announced that they were going ahead with these modifications. Loch Fyne became the primary vessel on the Mallaig to Armadale route on 31 March 2017, with  carrying out additional sailings between her roster to Lochboisdale.

References

External links
MV Loch Fyne on www.calmac.co.uk

Caledonian MacBrayne
1991 ships
Ships built on the River Clyde